Shuili Township is a rural township in Nantou County, Taiwan.

Geography
It has a population total of 16,297 and an area of 106.8424 km2.

Administrative divisions
Shuili has 19 villages. Beipu, Chengzhong, Dingkan, Jucheng, Jugong, Junkeng, Minhe, Nanguang, Nongfu, Shangan, Shuili, Xincheng, Xinglong, Xinshan, Xinxing, Yongfeng, Yongxing, Yufeng and Zhongyang Village.

Tourist attractions
 Minghu Dam
 Mingtan Dam
 Shuili River
 Shuili Snake Kiln Ceramics Cultural Park
 Checheng Wood Museum
 Mei Agriculture Recreational Area
 Stone Guanyin Suspension Bridge
 Yiqing Winery

Transportation

Rail

Shuili Township is accessible by Shuili Station and Checheng Station of the TRA Jiji Line.

Bus
Shuili Township is served by Yuanlin Bus, All Day Bus, Green Transit Bus and Nantou Bus.

Notable natives
 Hsiao Chia-chi, Deputy Secretary-General of Executive Yuan (2014)

See also
 Nantou County

References

External links

 Shuili Township Office, Nantou County 

Townships in Nantou County